Jacqueline Louise Hawker (born 21 February 1981) is an English former cricketer who played as a right-handed batter and right-arm medium bowler. She appeared in one Test match and seven One Day Internationals for England between 1999 and 2002. She made her international debut against the Netherlands on 19 July 1999 and made her final appearance for England on 24 January 2002 against India. Prior to her full-international call-up, Hawker played for England under-19s at the age of 14, and later scored 56 runs for the England 'A' team against India in 1999. She played domestic cricket for West of England and Somerset.

References

External links
 

1981 births
Living people
Cricketers from Plymouth, Devon
England women Test cricketers
England women One Day International cricketers
West women cricketers
Somerset women cricketers